The following outline is provided as an overview of and topical guide to Goa:

Goa – state in southwest India, bounded by Maharashtra to the north and Karnataka to the east and south, while the Arabian Sea forms its western coast. It is India's smallest state by area and the fourth smallest by population.  Goa is one of India's richest states with a GDP per capita two and a half times that of the country. It was ranked the best placed state by the Eleventh Finance Commission for its infrastructure and ranked on top for the best quality of life in India by the National Commission on Population based on the 12 Indicators.

General reference

Names 
 Official name(s): State of Goa
 Common name(s): Goa
 Pronunciation:
 Etymology: Etymology of Goa
 Local name: Goem
 Nickname: Pearl of the Orient
 Adjectival(s): Goan, Goenkar, Goykar, Goes
 Demonym(s): Goans, Goenkars, Goes/Goesa, Goanese (considered derogatory by some)
 Abbreviations and name codes
 ISO 3166-2 code: IN-GA
 Vehicle registration code: GA, series: List of Regional Transport Office districts in Goa

Rankings (amongst India's states) 

 by population: 25th
 by area (2011 census): 28th (Goa is the smallest state of India)
 by crime rate (2019): 23th
 by gross domestic product (GDP) (2014): 21st
by Human Development Index (HDI) (2018): 2nd
by life expectancy at birth: 
by literacy rate (2011): 4th 
Indian states ranking by media exposure (2015-16): 2nd

Geography of Goa 

Geography of Goa
 Goa is: an Indian state
 Population of Goa: 1,457,723
 Area of Goa:  3,702 km2 (1,429 sq mi)

Location of Goa 
 Goa is situated within the following regions:
 Northern Hemisphere
 Eastern Hemisphere
 Eurasia
 Asia
 South Asia
 Indian Subcontinent
 India
 Western India
 Konkan
 Time zone:  Indian Standard Time (UTC+05:30)

Environment of Goa 

 Biodiversity hotspots in Goa
 Western Ghats
 Climate of Goa
 Protected areas of Goa
National parks of Goa
 Mollem National Park
Wildlife Sanctuaries of Goa
 Bhagwan Mahaveer Wildlife Sanctuary
 Bondla Wildlife Sanctuary
 Cotigao Wildlife Sanctuary
 Mhadei Wildlife Sanctuary
 Netravali Wildlife Sanctuary
 Salim Ali Bird Sanctuary
 Wildlife of Goa
 Flora and fauna of Goa
 Birds of Goa
 Seabirds of Goa

Natural geographic features of Goa 

 Bodies of water of Goa
 Arabian Sea
 Lakes of Goa
 Mayem Lake
 Nanda Lake
 Rivers of Goa
 Hills and mountains of Goa
 Sonsogor
 Western Ghats (range)
 Highest Peak of Goa: Sonsogor
 Islands of Goa
 Konkan Coast
 Mountain passes in Goa
 Braganza Ghats
 Chorla Ghat
 Waterfalls in Goa

Administrative divisions of Goa 

 Districts of Goa
 Talukas of Goa
 Cities and Towns of Goa
 Municipal Corporations
Panaji
 Municipalities
Bicholim
Canacona
Cuncolim
Curchorem
Mapusa (Mapusa Municipal Council)
Margao
Mormugao
Pernem
Ponda
Quepem
Sanguem
Sanquelim
Valpoi
 Parishes of Goa
 Renamed places of Goa
 Villages and Agraharas in Goa and their ancient names

Demography of Goa 

Demographics of Goa

Government and politics of Goa 

 Form of government: Indian state government (parliamentary system of representative democracy)
 Capital of Goa: Panaji
 Elections in Goa
1963  1967  1972  1977  1980 
1984 
1989 
1994 
1999 
2002 
2007 
2011 
2017 
2022 
 Political issues in Goa
 Goa Special Status
Politics of Goa
Political families of Goa
Political Parties in Goa
Aam Aadmi Party
Bharatiya Janata Party / Bharatiya Janata Party, Goa
Goa Forward Party
Indian National Congress / Goa Pradesh Congress Committee
Maharashtrawadi Gomantak Party
Revolutionary Goans Party

Union government in Goa 
 Indian general election, 2009 (Goa)
 Indian general election, 2014 (Goa)
 Indian general election, 2019 (Goa)
 North Goa (Lok Sabha constituency)
 South Goa (Lok Sabha constituency)
 Rajya Sabha members from Goa

Branches of the government of Goa 
Government of Goa

Executive branch of the government of Goa 
 Head of state: Governor of Goa
 official residence - Raj Bhavan
 Head of government: Chief Minister of Goa, 
 Deputy Chief Ministers of Goa
Cabinet of Goa: Goa Council of Ministers
 Departments and agencies
 Directorate of Fire and Emergency Services, Goa
 Gazetteer of India, Union Territory: Goa, Daman and Diu
 Goa Human Rights Commission
 Goa Institute of Public Administration and Rural Development
 Goa Konkani Akademi
 Goa Lokayukta
 Goa Public Service Commission
 Goa State Election Commission
 Goa State Information Commission
 Gomant Vibhushan
 Kadamba Transport Corporation
 Sports Authority of Goa
 Yashadamini Puraskar

Legislative branch of the government of Goa 
 Goa Legislative Assembly
 Constituencies of Goa Legislative Assembly
 Goa State Legislative Assembly Complex
 Legislative capital: Porvorim

Judicial branch of the government of Goa 
Judiciary of Goa
High Court of Bombay at Goa
Judicial capital: Porvorim

Law and order in Goa 

Law of Goa
 Animal rights in Goa
 Capital punishment in Goa
 Goa civil code
 Human rights in Goa
 Freedom of religion in Goa
 LGBT rights in Goa
Pride De Goa
 Law enforcement in Goa
 Goa Police
 Polícia do Estado da Índia (1946 - 1961)
 Corpo de Polícia e Fiscalização da Índia (pre-1946)

 Organised Crime in Goa
  Goa mafia
 Penal system of Goa
 Reservation in Goa

History of Goa 

History of Goa
 Timeline of Goan history

History of Goa, by period

Portuguese Goa 

 Portuguese conquest of Goa
 Portuguese India
 Goa liberation movement

Indian Goa 

 Annexation of Portuguese India

History of Goa, by region

History of Goa, by subject 

 History of Goan Catholics
 Printing in Goa

Culture of Goa 

Culture of Goa
Architecture of Goa
 Architecture of Goan Catholics
 Goan houses
 Goan temple
 Comunidades of Goa
 Goan cuisine
 Goan Catholic cuisine
 Cultural capital: Margao
 Galleries, Libraries, Museums and Archives in Goa
 Archaeological Museum and Portrait Gallery
 Dr Francisco Luis Gomes District Library
 Goa Science Centre
 Goa State Central Library
 Goa State Museum
 Goa University Library
 Institute Menezes Braganza/Instituto Vasco da Gama
 Kala Academy
 Naval Aviation Museum
Geographical Indications of Goa
Feni
Goan Khaje
Harmal Chilli
Khola Chilli
Myndoli Banana
 Languages of Goa
 Media in Goa
 Mailing list
 Goanet
 Newspapers and magazines 
 Radio
 Television
 DD Goa
 Konkani-language television channels
 Monuments in Goa
 Azad Maidan
Forts of Goa
Gates of Goa
 Monuments of National Importance in Goa
 State Protected Monuments in Goa
 Public squares in Goa
 Susegad
 Symbols of Goa
 Seal of Goa
 World Heritage Sites in Goa
 Churches and convents of Goa

Art in Goa 
Arts of Goa
Kaavi art
 Cinema of Goa
 Konkani cinema
 National Film Award for Best Feature Film in Konkani
 Cultural and technical festivals of Goan colleges
Dances of Goa
Goan folk dances
Festivals in Goa
Carnival in Goa
Dindi
Goa Sand Art Festival
International Film Festival of India
Monti Fest
Sao Joao Festival in Goa
Serendipity Arts Festival
Shigmo
Sunburn Festival
Zagor
Zatra
Literary festivals in Goa
 Literature of Goa
 Goan Catholic literature
 Goan writers
 Fiction writers from Goa
 Poets in (and from) Goa
Music of Goa
Bands from Goa
Dulpod
Fell
Goa Trance
Goans in Hindi film music composition
Konkani liturgical music
Mando
Ovi
Traditional Musical Instruments of Goa
Dhol
Ghumot
Kansallem
Mhadalem
Shamel
Ver
Zoti 
Theatre in Goa
Sangeet Natak
Tiatr
Tiatr Academy of Goa
Tiatrists of Goa

People of Goa 
People of Goa
 Caste system in Goa
 Ethnic and social groups of Goa and Konkan
 Goan Catholics
 Culture of Goan Catholics
 Goan Catholic names and surnames
 Notable Goan Catholics
 Goan Hindus
 Culture of Goan Hindus
 Goan Muslims
 People from Goa

Religion in Goa 

Religion in Goa
 Christianity in Goa
 Christianization of Goa
 Pre-Portuguese Christianity in Goa
 Roman Catholic Archdiocese of Goa and Daman
 Hinduism in Goa
 Goan temple
 Temples in Goa
 Rock-cut temples in Goa
 Islam in Goa
 Goan Mosques
 Safa Mosque
 Jainism in Goa

Sports in Goa 

Sports in Goa
 Chess in Goa
 Goa State Chess Association
 Cricket in Goa
 Goa Cricket Association
 Goa cricket team
 Goa women's cricket team
 Goans in cricket
 Field hockey in Goa
 Goans in field hockey
 Football in Goa
 AIFF Elite Academy
 Goa Derby
 Goa Football Association
 Goa football team
 Goa Police Cup
 Goa Professional League
 GFA First Division League
 Goan State Football Champions
 Goans in football
 Goan Sports Association
 Goans in sports
 Running in Goa
 Goa Marathon

Symbols of Goa 

Symbols of Goa
 State animal:	Gaur, (Bos gaurus)
 State bird: Ruby Throated Yellow Bulbul, (Pycnonotus gularis)
 State fish: Grey mullet/Shevtto in Konkani (Mugil cephalus)
 State flower: Jasmine, (Plumeria rubra)
 State fruit: Cashew, (Anacardium occidentale)
 State heritage tree: Coconut palm, (Cocos nucifera)
 State motto: 
Devanagari - सर्वे भद्राणि पश्यन्तु मा कश्चिद् दुःखमाप्नुयात् 
Latin script - (May everyone see goodness, may none suffer any pain)		
 State seal: Seal of Goa
 State tree: Matti, (Terminalia crenulata)

Economy and infrastructure of Goa 
Economy of Goa
 Commercial capital: Margao
 Communications in Goa
 Internet in Goa
 Goa Broad Band Network
 Currency of Goa:
Xerafim:- Before 1668
Portuguese Indian rupia (1668 - 1958)
Portuguese Indian escudo (1958 - 1961)
Indian rupee (1961 - present)
Dams and Reservoirs in Goa
Hotels in Goa
Mapusa Municipal Market
Prisons in Goa
Shopping Malls in Goa
Stadiums in Goa
Arlem Breweries Ground
Bhausaheb Bandodkar Ground
Campal Indoor Complex
Dr. Rajendra Prasad Stadium
Dr Shyama Prasad Mukherjee Indoor Stadium
Duler Stadium
Fatorda Stadium
GMC Athletic Stadium
Goa Cricket Association Academy Ground
Goa Cricket Association Stadium
Railway Stadium, Vasco da Gama
Tilak Maidan Stadium
 Tourism in Goa
Beaches of Goa
Arambol
Chapora Beach
Galgibaga Beach
Palolem Beach
Querim Beach
Casino Goa
Fontainhas
Traditional occupations of Goa
Transport in Goa
 Airports in Goa
Bridges in Goa
Atal Setu
Mandovi Bridge
New Zuari Bridge
Ponte Conde de Linhares
Zuari Bridge
National Waterways of India
Chapora River
Cumbarjua Canal
Mandovi River
Mapusa River
Sal River
Zuari River
Ports in Goa
Mormugao Port
Railway in Goa
Hubli railway division
 Part of South Western Railway zone
 Guntakal–Vasco da Gama section (formerly West of India Portuguese Railway)
Karwar railway division
 Part of Konkan Railway
Skybus Metro
Roads in Goa
18th June Road
National Highways in Goa/National Highways in Goa (old numbering)

Education in Goa 

Education in Goa
 Goa Board of Secondary & Higher Secondary Education
 Goa University
Institutes of Higher Education in Goa
Schools in Goa

Health in Goa 

Health in Goa
COVID-19 pandemic in Goa
Hospitals in Goa
Medical Colleges in Goa
Ambulance service
GVK EMRI 108

See also 

 Outline of India

References

External links 

 Government of Goa official website
 Goa Review

Goa
Goa
Geography of Goa
Goa-related lists